Lyakhavichy District is an administrative subdivision, a raion of Brest Region, in Belarus. Its administrative center is Lyakhavichy.

Demographics
At the time of the Belarus Census (2009), Lyakhavichy Raion had a population of 30,498. Of these, 88.4% were of Belarusian, 6.5% Polish, 3.5% Russian and 0.9% Ukrainian ethnicity. 90.5% spoke Belarusian and 8.1% Russian as their native language.

Notable residents 
 Tadeusz Reytan (1742, Hrušaǔka estate – 1780), politician

References

 
Districts of Brest Region